In mathematics, a function  between two complex vector spaces is said to be antilinear or conjugate-linear if 

hold for all vectors  and every complex number  where  denotes the complex conjugate of  

Antilinear maps stand in contrast to linear maps, which are additive maps that are homogeneous rather than conjugate homogeneous. If the vector spaces are real then antilinearity is the same as linearity.

Antilinear maps occur in quantum mechanics in the study of time reversal and in spinor calculus, where it is customary to replace the bars over the basis vectors and the components of geometric objects by dots put above the indices. Scalar-valued antilinear maps often arise when dealing with complex inner products and Hilbert spaces.

Definitions and characterizations 

A function is called  or  if it is additive and conjugate homogeneous. 
An  on a vector space  is a scalar-valued antilinear map. 

A function  is called  if

while it is called  if 
 
In contrast, a linear map is a function that is additive and homogeneous, where  is called  if
 

Examples

Anti-linear dual map 

Isomorphism of anti-linear dual with real dual 

The anti-linear dualpg 36 of a complex vector space   is a special example because it is isomorphic to the real dual of the underlying real vector space of   This is given by the map sending an anti-linear map to  In the other direction, there is the inverse map sending a real dual vector  to  giving the desired map.

Properties 

The composite of two antilinear maps is a linear map. The class of semilinear maps generalizes the class of antilinear maps.

Anti-dual space 

 

 

Canonical isometry between the dual and anti-dual

The complex conjugate  of a functional  is defined by sending  to  It satisfies 

for every  and every  
This says exactly that the canonical antilinear bijection defined by
 
as well as its inverse  are antilinear isometries and consequently also homeomorphisms. 

If  then  and this canonical map  reduces down to the identity map.

Inner product spaces

 
where this inner product makes  and  into Hilbert spaces. 
Moreover, the canonical norm induced by this inner product (that is, the norm defined by ) is consistent with the dual norm (that is, as defined above by the supremum over the unit ball); explicitly, this means that the following holds for every 
 

and

See also

Citations

References 

 Budinich, P. and Trautman, A. The Spinorial Chessboard. Springer-Verlag, 1988. . (antilinear maps are discussed in section 3.3).
 Horn and Johnson, Matrix Analysis, Cambridge University Press, 1985. . (antilinear maps are discussed in section 4.6).
  

Functions and mappings
Linear algebra
Types of functions